J. Gregory Miller is an American horn player, composer and music arranger.

Early years
J. Greg "JG" Miller was born in Colorado into a non-musical family and grew up in Mohnton, Pennsylvania. He played with the Reading Symphony Youth Orchestra and the Philadelphia Youth Orchestra and graduated from Mifflin High School in Berks County. Miller attended the University of Rochester in pre-med, but changed majors and graduated in music performance and music education from the Eastman School of Music. He completed a Master of Music degree at the University of Arizona and then moved to Los Angeles where he received a doctorate degree in musical arts from the University of Southern California. Important teachers and influences include Daniel Katzen, James Thatcher, Peter Kurau, Kendall Betts and Erwin Chandler.

Career
Miller has performed with a number of ensembles and orchestras, including the Rochester Philharmonic Orchestra, Mariachi Sol de Mexico, the Desert Symphony, the Tucson Symphony Orchestra, and the Flagstaff Symphony Orchestra. He also has recorded in Hollywood studios on several films. In 2012–13, he toured with the British rock band The Who on the Quadrophenia and More tour and played with the band at the 12-12-12: The Concert for Sandy Relief at Madison Square Garden in New York City. While on The Who's Quadrophenia tour, Miller played trumpet, horn, flugelhorn, mellophone, trombone, and euphonium, covering the original work of John Entwistle on the Quadrophenia album.

He is a member of The United States Army Field Band horn section. He serves as the section leader and has performed on numerous albums including principal horn on the Grammy-winning “Soundtrack of the American Soldier.”

J. Greg writes and arranges music in popular, commercial, military and classical styles which has been performed internationally. He also has worked as a horn maker and welder for Lawson Horns. He currently is Vice President of Veritas Musica Publishing.

Awards

Miller has been recognized with the 2011 Brandon P. Merhle Award for Distinguished Service from the University of Southern California. He has also received the 2007 President's Award for Community Outreach from the University of Arizona.

Compositions
Selected compositions include:

The US Cyber Command March (2018)
The Redacted March (2014) for the United States Army Cyber Command 
Foglissimo! (2007) written for Allen Fogle
Seven Sets on The Odyssey (2008)
Cloak and Dagger Games (2010)

Recordings
Selected recordings include:

La Musica by José Hernández (musician) 2012

Barcelonazo by Jorge Liderman, 2008, Bridge Records

References

External links
Official site
Veritas Music Publishing
Miller plays with The Who

American classical horn players
Living people
University of Arizona alumni
USC Thornton School of Music alumni
Year of birth missing (living people)
Eastman School of Music alumni
Musicians from Colorado